TVR București is the state-owned regional TV station available in Muntenia, broadcasting since 19 March 2007. Its headquarters are in Bucharest.

References

External links
 TVR

 and Hungary

Bucharest
Mass media in Bucharest
Television channels and stations established in 2007
Television stations in Romania